Karulina Koogu is a 1994 Indian Kannada-language drama film directed by D. Rajendra Babu and produced by vizag Raju. The film stars Prabhakar, Vinaya Prasad and Srinath. The film was widely popular for the songs composed and written by Hamsalekha upon release.

The film is a remake of Malayalam hit Akashadoothu (1993) directed by Sibi Malayil and was subsequently remade in Telugu as Mathrudevobhava (1993). Both the versions had actress Madhavi in the lead role. However, in Kannada version, she was replaced by Vinaya Prasad.

Plot

A Church-like Hindu order provides the spiritual context for this unusual story about the extinction of a lower-class alcoholic family. The drunkard Mohan (Tiger Prabhakar ) is married to Sharada (Vinaya Prasad), a cultured music teacher employed in a Hindu ashram, who tries to reform her husband. The villain in this allegory of a Hindu community is a Christian, Antony, who tries to rape Sharada and later kills Mohan shortly after Sharada is diagnosed as terminally ill with cancer. Sharada dies before she can find adoptive parents for her children, but the saintly head of the ashram (Srinath) does this for her. The film also has a few comic scenes, e.g. in a bar, where a series of jokes culminate in a song talking about the plight of Kannada speaking people in Bangalore city.

Cast 
 Tiger Prabhakar as Mohan 
 Vinaya Prasad as Sharada 
 Srinath as Swamiji 
 Doddanna
 Ashalatha
 Shanthamma
 Umashree as Arrack shop owner Rukkamma 
 Srinivasa Murthy
 Pramila Joshai
 Lakshman Rao 
 M. S. Karanth 
 Richard Louis
 Baby Roopa 
 Bank Suresh

Soundtrack 
The music of the film was composed and lyrics written by Hamsalekha. All the songs in the soundtrack were received well upon release.

References

External links 
 

1994 films
1990s Kannada-language films
Indian drama films
Indian films about cancer
Films scored by Hamsalekha
Kannada remakes of Malayalam films
Films directed by D. Rajendra Babu
1994 drama films